VeVe is a mobile application available for Android and iOS devices, developed by Ecomi. The app serves as a platform for the buying and selling of licensed digital collectibles, including non-fungible tokens (NFTs). VeVe has the distinction of being the first marketplace to offer NFTs from prominent brands such as Marvel, DC, Disney, Star Wars, Givenchy, Coca-Cola, and Pixar.

History
VeVe has formed several partnerships with notable entities to offer unique NFT collections to its users. In June 2021, VeVe collaborated with Givenchy to release a series of NFT art pieces by Amar Singh to support LGBTQIA+ causes. Later, in August 2021, VeVe partnered with Marvel Entertainment to release the first-ever NFT of Spider-Man. VeVe also partnered with Star Trek in September 2021 to offer NFTs based on iconic starships, such as the Enterprise-D and Borg Cube.

In November 2021, VeVe collaborated with the United States Postal Service to create NFT stamp collectibles commemorating the Day of the Dead holiday, followed by a Christmas-themed set released in December of the same year. Additionally, VeVe partnered with Disney in November 2021 to release a series of NFT collectibles called "Golden Moments," featuring beloved characters from Disney, Pixar, Marvel, and Star Wars. VeVe continued to work with Disney, releasing a collection for the iconic Steamboat Willie character in December 2021 and a set of interactive lenticular card NFTs from Mickey & Friends in February 2022.

However, not all of VeVe's collaborations have been successful. In February 2022, Chaosium, the makers of Call of Cthulhu, suspended the production of their NFTs on VeVe following criticism from some of their user base. Despite this setback, VeVe continued to forge partnerships, teaming up with Lamborghini in February 2023 to release a set of 3D digital collectibles based on the Huracán STO line of sports cars.

References

Mobile software
Android (operating system) software
IOS software
Non-fungible token